Stephen Jones (born 4 November 1953 in Pimlico, London) is an English editor of horror anthologies, and the author of several book-length studies of horror and fantasy films as well as an account of H. P. Lovecraft's early British publications.

Jones and Kim Newman have edited several books together,  including Horror: 100 Best Books, the 1988 horror volume in Xanadu's 100 Best series, and Horror: Another 100 Best Books, a 2005 sequel from Carroll & Graf (US publisher of the earlier series). Each comprises 100 essays by 100 horror writers about 100 horror books and each was recognised by the Horror Writers of America with its annual Bram Stoker Award for Best Non-Fiction.

Jones has edited anthologies such as the Dark Voices, Dark Terrors, Best New Horror series, The Mammoth Book of Vampires, The Mammoth Book of Zombies, The Mammoth Book of Dracula, The Mammoth Book of Frankenstein, The Mammoth Book of Vampire Stories by Women, The Vampire Stories of R. Chetwynd-Hayes, The Conan Chronicles, 1 and The Conan Chronicles, 2 by Robert E. Howard, and Scream Quietly: The Best of Charles L. Grant. Jones also edited Dancing with the Dark, a collection of stories of allegedly real life encounters with the paranormal by established horror writers.

Jones has been the recipient of a Hugo award and many Bram Stoker Awards. His Mammoth book Best New Horror (1990, with Ramsey Campbell) was a World Fantasy Award winner. Volume 29, the most recent installment of the annual anthology, was published in 2019.

Bibliography

Non-fiction

Fiction

Works as editor

Anthology series

Dark Voices 
 Dark Voices: The Best from the Pan Book of Horror Stories (1990) with David Sutton
 Dark Voices 2 (1990) with David Sutton
 Dark Voices 3 (1991) with David Sutton
 Dark Voices 4 (1992) with David Sutton
 Dark Voices 5 (1993) with David Sutton
 Dark Voices 6: The Pan Book of Horror (1994) with David Sutton

Dark Terrors 
 Dark Terrors (1995) with David Sutton
 Dark Terrors 2 (1996) with David Sutton
 Dark Terrors 3 (1997) with David Sutton
 Dark Terrors 4 (1998) with David Sutton
 Dark Terrors 5 (2000) with David Sutton
 Dark Terrors 6 (2002) with David Sutton

Best New Horror 
 Best New Horror (1990) with Ramsey Campbell
 Best New Horror 2 (1991) with Ramsey Campbell
 Best New Horror 3 (1992) with Ramsey Campbell
 Best New Horror 4 (1993) with Ramsey Campbell
 Best New Horror 5 (1994) with Ramsey Campbell
 Best New Horror 6 (1995)
 The Mammoth Book of Best New Horror: Volume 7 (1996)
 The Mammoth Book of Best New Horror: Volume 8 (1997)
 The Mammoth Book of Best New Horror: Volume 9 (1998)
 The Mammoth Book of Best New Horror: Volume 10 (1999)
 The Mammoth Book of Best New Horror: Volume 11 (2000)
 The Mammoth Book of Best New Horror: Volume 12 (2001)
 The Mammoth Book of Best New Horror: Volume 13 (2002)
 The Mammoth Book of Best New Horror: Volume 14 (2003)
 The Mammoth Book of Best New Horror: Volume 15 (2004)
 The Mammoth Book of Best New Horror: Volume 16 (2005)
 The Mammoth Book of Best New Horror: Volume 17 (2006)
 The Mammoth Book of Best New Horror: Volume 18 (2007)
 The Mammoth Book of Best New Horror: Volume 19 (2008)
 The Mammoth Book of Best New Horror: Volume 20 (2009)
 The Mammoth Book of Best New Horror: Volume 21 (2010)
 The Mammoth Book of Best New Horror: Volume 22 (2011)
 The Mammoth Book of Best New Horror: Volume 23 (2012)
 The Mammoth Book of Best New Horror: Volume 24 (2013)
 The Mammoth Book of Best New Horror: Volume 25 (2014)
 Best New Horror 26 (2015)
 Best New Horror 27 (2017)
 Best New Horror 28 (2018)
 Best New Horror 29 (2019)

The Mammoth Book of... 
 The Mammoth Book of Terror (1991)
 The Mammoth Book of Vampires (1992)
 The Mammoth Book of Zombies (1993)
 The Mammoth Book of Frankenstein (1994)
 The Mammoth Book of Werewolves (1994)
 The Mammoth Book of Dracula (1997)
 The Mammoth Book of New Terror (2004)
 The Mammoth Book of Monsters (2007)
 The Mammoth Book of Wolf Men (2009)
 The Mammoth Book of Zombie Apocalypse! (2010)
 The Mammoth Book of Zombie Apocalypse! Fightback (2012)
 Zombie Apocalypse! Endgame (2014)
 The Mammoth Book of Halloween Stories (2018)
 The Mammoth Book of Folk Lore: Evil Lives on in the Land! (2021)

Standalone Anthologies 

 Now We Are Sick: An Anthology of Nasty Verse (1991) with Neil Gaiman
 H. P. Lovecraft's Book of Horror (1993) with Dave Carson
 Shadows Over Innsmouth (1994)
 The Anthology of Fantasy & the Supernatural (1994) with David Sutton
 The Giant Book of Terror (1994) with Ramsey Campbell
 Dark of the Night (1997)
 Dark Detectives (1999)
 White of the Moon: New Tales of Madness and Dread (1999)
 Great Ghost Stories (2004) with R. Chetwynd-Hayes
 Weird Shadows Over Innsmouth (2005)
 Tales to Freeze the Blood: More Great Ghost Stories (2006) with R. Chetwynd-Hayes
 H. P. Lovecraft's Book of the Supernatural: Classic Tales of the Macabre (2006)
 Summer Chills: Tales of Vacation Horror (2007)
 The Dead That Walk: Flesh-Eating Stories (2009)
 Visitants: Stories of Fallen Angels & Heavenly Hosts (2010)
 Haunts: Reliquaries of the Dead (2011)
 A Book of Horrors (2011)
 Psycho-Mania! (2013)
 Fearie Tales: Stories of the Grimm and Gruesome (2013)
 Weirder Shadows Over Innsmouth (2013)
 Horrorology (2015)
 In the Shadow of Frankenstein: Tales of the Modern Prometheus (2016)
 In the Footsteps of Dracula: Tales of the Un-Dead Count (2017)
 The Mammoth Book of Nightmare Stories (2019)
 Terrifying Tales to Tell at Night (2019)

Awards
1984: World Fantasy Award: Special Award Non-Professional, for Fantasy Tales
1989: Bram Stoker Award, for Horror: 100 Best Books, shared with co-editor Kim Newman
1991: World Fantasy Award: Anthology, for Best New Horror
1992: Bram Stoker Award for Barker's Shadows in Eden
1996: International Horror Guild Award for Best New Horror 6
1998: Bram Stoker Award for Exorcisms and Ecstasies
1999: International Horror Guild Award for Dark Terrors 4
2002: World Fantasy Award: "Special Award Professional: for editing" 
2003: International Horror Guild Award, for Dark Terrors 6
2005: Bram Stoker Award, for Horror: Another 100 Best Books, shared with co-editor Kim Newman
2017: Rondo Hatton Classic Horror Award:  Book of the Year, for The Art of Horror Movies: An Illustrated History

References

External links

 Stephen Jones at Fantastic Fiction
Podcast audio interview with Stephen Jones
  

1953 births
English horror writers
Hugo Award-winning writers
World Fantasy Award winners
People from Pimlico
Living people
British speculative fiction editors
Male speculative fiction editors